Vatican Media, formerly Centro Televisivo Vaticano, is the Holy See's national broadcaster based in Vatican City which first aired in 1983.

History of the channel
Created in 1983 by Pope John Paul II, Vatican Media is, since November 1996, an institution legally associated with The Vatican.

Organization

Board of directors

Directors 
Archives director, John Patrick Foley: 1984–1989
Emilio Rossi: 1989–2008
Claudio Maria Celli: since 26 May 2009

General directors 
Giovanni Marra: 1984 – 7 June 1986
Ugo Moretto: May 1997 – June 2001
Federico Lombardi: 11 July 2001 – 22 January 2013
Dario Edoardo Viganò: 22 January 2013 – 21 December 2015
Stefano D’Agostini: since 21 December 2015

Administrative secretaries 
Antonio Mandelli: 1988–2001
Roberto Romolo: since 2001

Missions
Vatican Media's main goal is the universal expansion of Catholicism  by creating television materials and broadcasting images of the pope and of Vatican activities.

Programs
Programs are mainly based on what happens in the Vatican. Daily prayers such as Angelus, general audiences on Wednesdays, and various celebrations are broadcast. The pope's travels around the world are also broadcast.
Each year, CTV broadcasts around 130 events in the Vatican and covers daily public activities of the pope and his main activities outside the Vatican.

Octava Dies is a weekly magazine of 25 minutes broadcast in the entire world since Easter 1998. It is also broadcast by Italian Catholic television channels and by press agencies such as APTN. It is available in English and Italian on the Vatican's website (broadcast every Sunday at 12:30 after the Angelus).

Broadcast (Vatican Television Center)
Live broadcasts are made on the Vatican's website and by other Italian catholic television channels such as Telepace or TV2000, and foreign television channels such as KTO. The Vatican does not have its own television station. If asked Vatican Media also gives images to other television channels for events in the Vatican or during the pope's visits around the world. In the Vatican, it can offer assistance setting up press centers and press conferences, and also with services for special reporters and video and audio help for foreign television channels. "It conducts around 130 live broadcasts per annum, produces documentaries, creates a weekly magazine program called Octava Dies that is distributed internationally, and serves as an archival facility for all of its footage. On Sundays the station uses Intelsat to broadcast the pope's Angelus to the United States."

Production
Vatican Media produced many documentaries during the reigns of Pope John Paul II and Pope Benedict XVI. It made documentaries on the lives of the popes, on the Vatican City, and on the main churches of Catholicism. They were mainly broadcast in Italian but also in English, Spanish, French and other languages.

Archive center
Vatican Media owns a library of more than 10000 recordings, amounting to 4000 hours of recordings and images of Pope John Paul II's pontificate since 1984. This library is open to foreign television channels and to documentary producers from throughout the world. The Vatican Media Center is open Monday to Saturday from 9a.m. to 1p.m.

Logos

See also
 Catholic television
 Catholic television channels
 Catholic television networks
 Index of Vatican City–related articles
 Padre Pio TV
 Radio Maria
 Telepace

References

External links

Livestream Vatican Media on YouTube

Dicastery for Communication
Publicly funded broadcasters
Catholic television networks
Television channels in Vatican City
State media
1983 establishments in Vatican City
Television channels and stations established in 1983